Tomasz Tułacz (born 29 December 1969) is a Polish professional football manager and former player, who is the current manager of Puszcza Niepołomice.

From 1988 to 1994 he was a Stal Mielec's player in Ekstraklasa, with a seasonal spell at Stal Stalowa Wola, which played in the lower league. He ended his football career with Tłoki Gorzyce in 2004.

He has been the coach of Puszcza Niepołomice since 13 August 2015.

References

External links
 

1969 births
Living people
Polish footballers
Association football midfielders
Stal Mielec players
Stal Stalowa Wola players
Stal Rzeszów players
Stal Gorzyce players
Ekstraklasa players
I liga players
Polish football managers
I liga managers
II liga managers